William S. Condon is a researcher who investigated human interactions. He developed the concept of situation synchrony.

Cultural references
In Malcolm Gladwell's 2000 book, The Tipping Point, he cites Condon's research to help explain why some "Salesman" types may contribute more to word-of-mouth cultural 'epidemics'.

Some other reference is made in Flora Davis's book "Inside Intuition-What we know about Non-Verbal Communication" published in New York by McGraw-Hill Books. Which talks about the study he did on Interactional Syncrony.

Works
 Condon, W. S. (1996). Sound-Film Microanalysis: A Means for Correlating Brain and Behavior in Persons with Autism. Proceedings of the 1996 Autism Society of America National Conference, Milwaukee, WI, July 1996, 221–225.
 Condon, W. S. (1985). Sound-Film Microanalysis: A Means for Correlating Brain and Behavior. In Frank Duffy and Norman Geschwind (Eds.), Dyslexia: A Neuroscientific Approach to Clinical Evaluation, Boston, MA: Little, Brown & Co., 123–156.
 Condon, W. S. (1974) Cultural Microrhythms. In M. Davis (Ed.), Interaction Rhythms. New York: Human Sciences, 1982.
 Condon, W. S. (1971). Speech and Body Motion Synchrony of the Speaker-Hearer. In D. L. Horton and J. J. Jenkins (Eds.), Perception of Language, Columbus, Ohio: Merrill, 150–173.
 Condon, W. S. (1974). Multiple response to sound in autistic-like children. Proceedings of the National Society for Autistic Children Conference, Washington, DC, June 1974.
 Condon, W. S. and Sander, L. W. (1974). Neonate movement is synchronized with adult speech. Integrated participation and language acquisition. Science 183:99.
 Condon, W. S. (1963) Synchrony units and the communicational hierarchy. Paper presented at Western Psychiatric Institute & Clinics, Pittsburgh, PA

References

Living people
Year of birth missing (living people)
21st-century American psychologists